Daniel Raphaël Mayer (29 April 1909 – 29 December 1996) was a French politician and a member of the French Section of the Workers' International (SFIO) and president of the Ligue des droits de l'homme (LDH, Human Rights League) from 1958 to 1975.  He founded the Comité d'Action Socialiste in 1941 and was a member of the Brutus Network, a Resistant Socialist group. Mayer also supported the Libération-sud resistance movement headed by Emmanuel d'Astier de la Vigerie.

References

1909 births
1996 deaths
Politicians from Paris
Jewish French politicians
French Section of the Workers' International politicians
Unified Socialist Party (France) politicians
French Ministers of Veterans Affairs
Members of the Constituent Assembly of France (1945)
Members of the Constituent Assembly of France (1946)
Deputies of the 1st National Assembly of the French Fourth Republic
Deputies of the 2nd National Assembly of the French Fourth Republic
Deputies of the 3rd National Assembly of the French Fourth Republic
Human Rights League (France) members
French Resistance members
Jewish socialists